Terreur 404 is a French-Canadian horror anthology webseries directed by Sébastien Diaz and written by Samuel Archibald and . The series is exclusively available via Tou.tv.

Series overview

Episodes

Season 1 (2017)

Season 2 (2018)

Reception
The series was widely praised as a French-Canadian project garnering international recognition. It has been called a "Canadian Black Mirror".

Awards

References

External links

Canadian drama web series
Canadian horror fiction television series
2010s horror television series